Dewi Yuliawati (born 2 June 1997) is an Indonesian competitive rower.

She competed at the 2016 Summer Olympics in Rio de Janeiro, in the women's single sculls.

References

External links
 

1997 births
Living people
Indonesian female rowers
Olympic rowers of Indonesia
Rowers at the 2016 Summer Olympics
People from Tangerang
Sportspeople from Banten
Rowers at the 2018 Asian Games
Asian Games competitors for Indonesia
21st-century Indonesian women